The Jefferson County Courthouse Annex in Louisville, Kentucky was designed by Kenneth McDonald, Sr. and built in 1900.  It was listed on the National Register of Historic Places in 1980.

It is a four-story steel construction building with a brick veneer, joined to the Greek Revival Jefferson County Courthouse building by a bridge on the 2nd, 3rd, and 4th floors, over a narrow street.

It was designed by architect Kenneth McDonald Sr.  It was described in its NRHP nomination as "stylistically a handsome complement" to the Jefferson County Courthouse.

The Jefferson County Courthouse was previously listed, in 1972.

References

Government buildings completed in 1900
Local landmarks in Louisville, Kentucky
National Register of Historic Places in Louisville, Kentucky
Courthouses on the National Register of Historic Places in Kentucky
County courthouses in Kentucky
1900 establishments in Kentucky